Marie Charlotte Blanc (née Hensel; 23 September 1833 – 25 July 1881) was a German socialite and businesswoman. She was a prominent member of high society in Monaco and France. After the death of her husband,  François Blanc, she operated the Monte Carlo Casino.

Biography 
Marie Charlotte Hensel was born on 23 September 1833 in Friedrichsdorf to working class parents. Her father was a shoemaker. At the age of 14 she entered service as a maid for French businessman François Blanc; his wife, Madeleine-Victoire Huguelin; and their two children, Camille and Charles, at their home in Bad Homburg vor der Höhe. While in their service, Hensel learned to speak French. In 1852 Madeleine-Victoire Huguelin died. On 20 June 1854 Blanc and Hensel married in Paris. They had three children. Her eldest daughter, Louise, married Prince Constantine Radziwiłł. Her younger daughter, Marie-Félix, married Prince Roland Bonaparte. Her son, Edmond, became Mayor of La Celle Saint-Cloud.

In 1856 Charles III of Monaco hired François Blanc, who successfully operated a casino in Germany, to create a casino in Monaco. He founded the Monte Carlo Casino and, in 1861, co-founded the Société des bains de mer de Monaco. While living in Monaco, Hensel helped her husband establish the casino in Monte Carlo. On 27 July 1877 her husband died due to respiratory problems while in Leukerbad, Switzerland for treatment. After her husband's death, Hensel inherited 72 million francs and took control of the Monte Carlo Casino. She worked with Charles Garnier to build the Opéra de Monte-Carlo.

In 1871 Hensel purchased Ermenonville Castle for her daughter, Louise. Hensel died on 25 July 1881 in Moûtiers.

Gallery

References 

1833 births
1881 deaths
Blanc family
Businesspeople in the casino industry
People from Friedrichsdorf
German socialites
German expatriates in France
19th-century German businesswomen
19th-century German businesspeople